α-Pyrrolidinohexiophenone (α-PHP, A-PHP, Aphp, alpha-PHP, α-Pyrrolidinohexanophenone, PV-7) is a synthetic stimulant drug of the cathinone class developed in the 1960s which has been reported as a novel designer drug.

Similar chemical compounds 
α-Pyrrolidinohexiophenone is a longer chain homologue of α-PVP, having an extra carbon on the alkyl side chain. Regarding the potency of alpha-PHP in the brain, chemist Michael H. Baumann of the Designer Drug Research Unit (established by Baumann) of the National Institute on Drug Abuse stated: "alpha-PHP might be even more potent than alpha-PVP"; this statement is based on laboratory tests of chemical reactivity.

Pyrovalerone is a structural isomer of alpha-PHP.

Legality
In the United States, α-PHP in the past has been assigned to Schedule I on a Temporary Placement basis, although the order has expired without renewal or permanent placement and is no longer Scheduled at the Federal level as of July 2021. Despite this however, α-PHP may be considered an analogue of α-PVP, a Schedule I drug under the Controlled Substances Act. As such, possession or the sale for human consumption or the use for illicit non-medical or industrial intents and purposes could be prosecuted as crimes under the Federal Analogue Act.

The President of the Republic of Italy classified cathinone and all structurally derived analogues (including pyrovalerone analogues) as narcotics in January 2012.

Sweden's public health agency suggested to classify α-PHP as narcotic on June 1, 2015.

As of October 2015, α-PHP is a controlled substance in China.

In December 2019, the UNODC announced scheduling recommendations placing Alpha-PHP into Schedule II.

As of October 29, 2021, α-PHP has been banned in the Netherlands under the 1971 Vienna Convention on Psychotropic Substances.

See also 
 α-PHiP
 α-PHPP
 α-PBP
 α-PPP
 A-PCyP
 4F-PHP
 4-Methyl-α-PHP
 Prolintane
 Pyrovalerone
 MDPV
 MDPHP

References 

Designer drugs
Norepinephrine–dopamine reuptake inhibitors
Pyrrolidinophenones
Stimulants
Butyl compounds